"Worst That Could Happen" is a song with lyrics and music written by singer-songwriter Jimmy Webb. Originally recorded by The 5th Dimension on their 1967 album of nearly all-Jimmy Webb songs, The Magic Garden, "Worst That Could Happen" was later recorded by The Brooklyn Bridge and reached the Billboard Hot 100's top 40, at #38 on January 4, 1969, peaking at #3 on February 1-8, 1969.

The song tells about a man wishing well to a woman with whom he is still in love, but because the man was unwilling to settle down, she left him and is about to marry someone else who is more stable; the singer accepts the marriage but still feels that it is "the worst (thing) that could happen to (him)".  It has been stated that, along with "MacArthur Park" and "By the Time I Get to Phoenix", "Worst That Could Happen" is about a relationship that Webb had with a woman named Susan.

The song is noted for the quoting of Mendelssohn's "Wedding March" from the incidental music to A Midsummer Night's Dream, which is heard at the end.

According to BMI (Broadcast Music Inc.) the legal title of the song is "Worst That Could Happen."

The Brooklyn Bridge version appeared on the list of songs deemed inappropriate by Clear Channel following the September 11, 2001, attacks.

Chart history

Weekly charts

Year-end charts

Other cover versions
 B.J. Thomas on his 1969 LP, Young And In Love.
 The Lettermen in 1969 on their I Have Dreamed album.
 Hajji Alejandro recorded a Tagalog version titled “Panakip-Butas” in 1977 in his Hajji album. It was released as a single and was a big hit in the Philippines.
 Jimmy Webb on his 1996 album Ten Easy Pieces.

See also
 List of 1960s one-hit wonders in the United States

References

1967 songs
1968 debut singles
The 5th Dimension songs
Johnny Maestro songs
Songs written by Jimmy Webb
Buddah Records singles
Songs about marriage